A BB gun is a type of air gun designed to shoot metallic spherical projectiles called BBs (not to be confused with similar-looking bearing balls), which are approximately the same size as BB-size lead birdshot used on shotguns ( in diameter).

The term "BB gun" is frequently used incorrectly to describe airsoft guns, which shoot plastic pellets (also often referred to as "BBs") that are larger (usually  in diameter) but much less dense than metal BBs, and have significantly lower ballistic performance.  The term is also sometimes used to describe a pellet gun, which shoots diabolo-shaped (not spherical) lead projectiles at higher power and velocity.  Although some BB guns can also shoot pellets, the reverse situation is not true: steel BB balls have greater stiffness and are not meant to be shot from pellet guns, whose barrels are typically rifled and thus can get stuck (similar to a squib load in firearms) and lead to a damage or mechanical failure within the pellet gun.

History 

The term BB originated from the nomenclature of the size of lead shots used in a smoothbore shotgun. Size "BB" shots were nominally , but tended to vary considerably in size due to the loose tolerances in shotshells. The highest size shotgun pellet commonly used was named 00 or double ought and was used for hunting deer and thus called buckshot, while the smaller BB-sized shot was typically used to shoot small/medium-sized game birds and therefore was a birdshot.

In 1886, the Markham Air Rifle Company in Plymouth, Michigan produced the first wooden-construct spring-piston air rifle design as a youth training gun, and used the BB-size birdshot as the chosen ammunition. Two years later, the neighbouring Plymouth Air Rifle Company (later renamed Daisy Manufacturing Company in 1895) introduced the first full-metal airgun that also fired BB shots – the Daisy BB Gun, which became a very popular household name due to its successful marketing. They called these "round shots", but the BB name was already well established, and consequently most users continued calling their guns BB guns, and the projectiles as BB shots or just BBs.

Subsequently, the term BB became generic, and is used loosely referring to any small spherical projectiles of various calibers and materials. This includes bearing balls often utilized by anti-personnel mines, .177 caliber lead/steel shots used by air guns, plastic round balls (such as the pellets used by airsoft guns), small marbles and many others.  It has become ubiquitous to refer to any steel ball, such as a BB, as a "ball bearing". However, BBs should not be confused with a ball bearing, which is a mechanical component using small internal rolling balls to reduce friction between moving parts of machines.

Operation

BB guns can use any of the operating mechanisms used for air guns. However, due to the inherent limited accuracy and short effective range of the projectile, only the simpler and less expensive mechanisms are generally used for guns designed to fire only BBs.

Because the strength of the steel BB does not allow it to be swaged with the low propelling force used to accelerate it through the barrel, BBs are slightly smaller than the internal diameter of the barrel. This limits accuracy because little spin is imparted on the BB. It also limits range, because some of the pressurized gas used to accelerate the BB leaks around it and reduces the overall efficiency. Since a BB will easily roll unhindered down the barrel, it is common to find guns that use a magnet in the loading mechanism to hold the BB at the rear of the barrel until it is fired.

The traditional and still most common powerplant for BB guns is the spring-piston pump, usually patterned after a lever-action rifle or a pump-action shotgun. The lever-action rifle was the first type of BB gun, and still dominates the inexpensive youth BB gun market. The Daisy Model 25, modeled after a pump-action shotgun with a trombone pump-action mechanism, dominated the low-price, higher-performance market for over 50 years (19141978).

Multiple-pump pneumatic guns are also common. Many pneumatic pellet guns provide the ability to use BBs as a cheaper alternative to lead shot. Some of these guns have rifled barrels, but the slightly undersized BBs do not swage in the barrel, so the rifling does not impart a significant spin. These are the types of guns that will benefit most from using precision lead BB shot. The pneumatic BB gun can attain much higher velocities than the traditional spring piston types.

The last common type of power for BB guns is compressed gas, most commonly the Powerlet cartridges. The powerlet is a disposable metal gas cylinder containing  of compressed carbon dioxide, with a self-contained valve to release the CO2 which expands to propel the BB. These are primarily used in BB pistols, and are capable of rapid firing unlike spring-piston or pneumatic types. A typical CO2 BB pistol uses a spring-loaded magazine to feed BBs, and a double-action trigger mechanism to chamber a BB and cock the hammer. However some guns (either to stay true to the original gun or to make the trigger pull easier) do have a single-action trigger. Either type of gun may also have blowback action, where CO2 will push the slide back in addition to firing a BB. When firing, the hammer strikes an internal valve linked to the CO2 source, which releases a measured amount of CO2 gas to fire the BB; this also gives it realistic recoil and muzzle report features. Many CO2 BB guns are patterned after popular firearms such as the Colt M1911, and can be used for training as well as recreation.

Some gas-powered BB guns use a larger source of gas, and provide machine gun-like fire. These types, most notably the Shooting Star Tommy Gun (originally known as the Feltman) are commonly found at carnivals. The MacGlashan BB Gun was used to train antiaircraft gunners in the United States Army Air Corps and United States Navy during World War II. A popular commercial model was the Larc M-19, which used 1 pound (454 g) canisters of Freon-12 refrigerant. These types have very simple operating mechanisms, based on a venturi pump. The gas is released in a constant stream, and this is used to suck the BBs up into the barrel at rates as high as 3600 rounds per minute.

Safety

Pellet airguns have the ability to fire considerably faster, even beyond .

A BB with a velocity of  has skin-piercing capability, and a velocity reaching  can fracture bone. This is potentially lethal, and this potential increases with velocity, but also rapidly decreases with distance. A person wearing jeans at this distance would not sustain serious injury. However, even at this distance a BB still might penetrate bare skin, and even if not, could leave a severe and painful bruise. The maximum range of a BB gun in the  range is 100–200 metres approximately (https://www.earmi.it/balistica/balest.htm), provided the muzzle is elevated to the optimum angle.

Steel BBs are prone to ricochet off hard surfaces such as brick, concrete, metal, or wood end grain. Eye protection is essential when shooting BBs at these materials, more so than when shooting lead pellets, since a BB bouncing off a hard surface can retain a large portion of its initial energy (pellets usually flatten and absorb energy), and could easily cause serious eye damage.

Quick Kill training
The U.S. Army trained recruits in Quick Kill techniques using Daisy Model 99 BB guns to improve soldiers using their weapons in the Vietnam War from 1967 to 1973. The technique was developed for the Army by Bobby Lamar "Lucky" McDaniel and Mike Jennings.

Legal status
BB guns are often regulated as a typical air gun.  Air gun laws vary widely by local jurisdiction.

See also
 Airsoft gun
 Paintball marker
 List of air guns
 Pellet (air gun)

References

External links
 US Patent 

Ammunition
Pneumatic weapons
 
Hunting equipment
Japanese inventions
Rifles
Recreational weapons